In Greek mythology, Pellen or Pelles (Ancient Greek: Πέλλης or Πελλῆς means "dark-coloured, dusky") was the founder of Pellene in Achaea. He was the son of Phorbas, son of Triopas of Thessaly, and the father of Hyperasius, father of the Argonauts, Amphion and Asterius.

Notes

References 

 Apollonius Rhodius, Argonautica translated by Robert Cooper Seaton (1853-1915), R. C. Loeb Classical Library Volume 001. London, William Heinemann Ltd, 1912. Online version at the Topos Text Project.
 Apollonius Rhodius, Argonautica. George W. Mooney. London. Longmans, Green. 1912. Greek text available at the Perseus Digital Library.
 Pausanias, Description of Greece with an English Translation by W.H.S. Jones, Litt.D., and H.A. Ormerod, M.A., in 4 Volumes. Cambridge, MA, Harvard University Press; London, William Heinemann Ltd. 1918. . Online version at the Perseus Digital Library
 Pausanias, Graeciae Descriptio. 3 vols. Leipzig, Teubner. 1903.  Greek text available at the Perseus Digital Library.

Princes in Greek mythology
Argive characters in Greek mythology
Mythology of Achaea